Manu Daftary is an American money manager who manages the Quaker Strategic Growth Fund. In the ten years from 1997 to 2006, the fund beat the S&P 500 by an average of nine percent per year.

Career 
He began his investment management career at the University of Southern California in 1985 where he was Assistant Treasurer of Investments. In 1988, he joined Geewax, Terker & Company as a portfolio manager in 1988, where he co-managed the firm's institutional accounts and managed equity short selling for the firm's hedge fund assets. While at GT&C, he designed an option overlay program for its institutional accounts. He then worked at Hellman, Jordan Investment Management Company as a senior vice-president/portfolio manager, and had lead responsibility for $500 million in institutional assets. There, he also participated in the management of $150 million in hedge fund assets. Daftary started his own investment firm in 1996, DG Capital Management, of which he is president and CEO

Education 
Daftary has a Bachelor of Arts in economics from the University of Mumbai, India. He is also a graduate of California State University, Long Beach., where he received both a Bachelor of Science and master of business administration. he is a holder of the chartered financial analyst credential.

References 

Year of birth missing (living people)
Living people
Indian emigrants to the United States
California State University, Long Beach alumni
University of Mumbai alumni
University of Southern California staff
American money managers
American Jains
CFA charterholders
American people of Indian descent